The 2013 Croatia Rally, formally the 40. Croatia Rally, was the tenth round of the 2013 European Rally Championship season.

Results

Special stages

References

Croatia
Sport in Istria County
2013 in Croatian sport
Rally competitions in Croatia
Croatia Rally